Kasyanka is a rural locality (a village) in Verkhneshardenskoye Rural Settlement, Velikoustyugsky District, Vologda Oblast, Russia. The population was 3 as of 2002.

Geography 
Kasyanka is located 57 km south of Veliky Ustyug (the district's administrative centre) by road. Gora is the nearest rural locality.

References 

Rural localities in Velikoustyugsky District